Tab Murphy is an American screenwriter, film producer, film director, and television writer.

Biography
Murphy's theatrical debut, Gorillas in the Mist, was nominated for an Academy Award for his writing. In 1995, Murphy made his directorial debut with Last of the Dogmen and wrote the feature. Afterwards, Murphy has spent nearly ten years with The Walt Disney Company writing The Hunchback of Notre Dame in 1996, Tarzan in 1999, Atlantis: The Lost Empire in 2001, and Brother Bear in 2003. During his time with Disney, he was hired by TriStar Pictures to write a treatment to a planned sequel to the 1998 film Godzilla. But due to negative reviews from critics and audiences alike, the planned sequel was cancelled. After working with Disney for a few years, he then left the company in 2006 and went to work at Warner Bros. Animation for a couple years. His work includes Superman/Batman: Apocalypse and Batman: Year One, and he wrote several episodes for the 2011 Thundercats reboot, Teen Titans Go! and Be Cool, Scooby-Doo!. While at Warner Bros., Murphy wrote the direct-to-video 3D thriller film Dark Country for Sony Pictures and Stage 6 Films, based on a short story written by Murphy, and directed by Thomas Jane. He was attached to write an animated feature directed by Kirk Wise called Galaxy Gas, and a TV pilot that was sold to Legendary Pictures. Towards the end of the 2010s, Murphy became involved as a writer of two crowdsourced short films: The Haunted Swordsman and The Passengers, based on the Stephen King short story Rest Stop. In June 2020, Murphy became attached to write a reimagining of the 1980 horror film The Changeling.

Filmography

Unproduced Features
 Godzilla 2 (1999)
 Beijing Safari (2012)
 Untitled China Project
 Galaxy Gas

Bibliography

Collaborators 
 The Walt Disney Company: The Hunchback of Notre Dame, Tarzan, Atlantis: The Lost Empire, Brother Bear (writer)
 Warner Bros.: Gorillas in The Mist, Batman: Year One, Batman/Superman: Apocalypse, Thundercats, Teen Titans Go, Be Cool, Scooby-Doo! (writer)

Award nominations
 1989 Academy Awards - Writing (Screenplay Based on Material From Another Medium for Gorillas in the Mist)
 1989 WGA Award (Screen) - Best Screenplay Based on Material from Another Medium (for Gorillas in the Mist)
 1997 Golden Raspberry Award - Worst Written Film Grossing Over $100 Million  (for The Hunchback of Notre Dame)
 1999 Annie Awards - Outstanding Individual Achievement for Writing in an Animated Feature Production (for Tarzan)
 2003 Annie Awards - Writing in an Animated Feature Production (for Brother Bear)

References

External links
 
  Official Facebook Page
 An Interview Tab Murphy - Atlantis Screenwriter; by Rick West - June 14, 2001
 Tab Murphy on Cake

American screenwriters
Animation screenwriters
Living people
Walt Disney Animation Studios people
Year of birth missing (living people)